Enneapterygius pyramis, the pyramid triplefin, is a species of triplefin blenny in the genus Enneapterygius. It was described by Ronald Fricke in 1994. This species occurs in the western Pacific Ocean from Guam to French Polynesia.

References

pyramis
Fish described in 1994